Greenfield Township is a township in Jones County, Iowa.

References

Populated places in Jones County, Iowa
Townships in Iowa